The aurochs (Bos primigenius) ( or ) is an extinct cattle species, considered to be the wild ancestor of modern domestic cattle.

The aurochs was part of the Pleistocene megafauna. It probably evolved in Asia and migrated west and north during warm interglacial periods. The oldest known aurochs fossils found in India and North Africa date to the Middle Pleistocene and in Europe to the Holstein interglacial. As indicated by fossil remains in Northern Europe, it reached Denmark and southern Sweden during the Holocene. The aurochs declined during the late Holocene due to habitat loss and hunting, and became extinct when the last individual died in 1627 in Jaktorów forest in Poland.

The aurochs is depicted in Paleolithic cave paintings, Neolithic petroglyphs, Ancient Egyptian reliefs and Bronze Age figurines. It symbolised power, sexual potency and prowess in religions of the ancient Near East. Its horns were used in votive offerings, as trophies and drinking horns.

Two aurochs domestication events occurred during the Neolithic Revolution. One gave rise to the domestic cattle (Bos taurus) in the Fertile Crescent in the Near East that was introduced to Europe via the Balkans and the coast of the Mediterranean Sea. Hybridisation between aurochs and early domestic cattle occurred during the early Holocene. Domestication of the Indian aurochs led to the zebu cattle (Bos indicus) that hybridised with early taurine cattle in the Near East about 4,000 years ago. Some modern cattle breeds exhibit features reminiscent of the aurochs, such as the dark colour and light eel stripe along the back of bulls, the lighter colour of cows, or an aurochs-like horn shape.

Etymology 
Both "aur" and "ur" are Germanic or Celtic words meaning wild ox.
The Old High German words ūr meaning "primordial" and ohso for "ox" were compounded to ūrohso, which became the early modern Aurochs.
The Latin word "urus" was used for wild ox since the Gallic Wars.

 
The use of the plural form  in English is a direct parallel of the German plural Ochsen and recreates the same distinction by analogy as English singular ox and plural oxen. "Aurochs" is both the singular and the plural term used to refer to the animal.

Taxonomy and evolution 
The scientific name Bos taurus was introduced by Carl Linnaeus in 1758 for feral cattle in Poland.
The scientific name Bos primigenius was proposed for the aurochs by Ludwig Heinrich Bojanus in 1827 who described the skeletal differences between the aurochs and domestic cattle.
The name Bos namadicus was used by Hugh Falconer in 1859 for cattle fossils found in Nerbudda deposits.
Bos primigenius mauritanicus was coined by Philippe Thomas in 1881 who described fossils found in deposits near Oued Seguen west of Constantine, Algeria.

In 2003, the International Commission on Zoological Nomenclature placed Bos primigenius on the Official List of Specific Names in Zoology and thereby recognized the validity of this name for a wild species.

Three aurochs subspecies are recognised:
 The Eurasian aurochs (B. p. primigenius) was part of the Pleistocene megafauna in Eurasia.
 The Indian aurochs (B. p. namadicus) lived on the Indian subcontinent.
 The North African aurochs (B. p. mauritanicus) lived north of the Sahara.

Evolution 
The following cladogram shows the phylogenetic relationships of the aurochs based on analysis of nuclear and mitochondrial genomes in the Bovini tribe:

The cold Pliocene climate caused an extension of open grassland, which supported the evolution of large grazers. Fossils of the Indian aurochs were excavated in alluvial deposits in South India dating to the Middle Pleistocene. It possibly migrated west into the Middle East during the Pleistocene. Middle Pleistocene aurochs fossils were also excavated in a Saharan erg in the Hoggar Mountains.

The earliest aurochs fossils excavated in Europe date to the Holstein interglacial 230,000 years Before Present (BP).
A mitochondrial DNA analysis showed that hybridisation between the aurochs and the steppe bison (Bison priscus) occurred about 120,000 years ago; the European bison (Bison bonasus) contains up to 10% aurochs ancestry.

Late Pleistocene aurochs fossils were found in Affad 23 in Sudan dating to 50,000 years ago when the climate in this region was more humid than during the African humid period.
Two aurochs bones found in the Romito Cave in Italy were radiocarbon dated to 20,210 and 19,351 years BP.
Aurochs bones found in a cave near San Teodoro, Sicily date to the Late Epigravettian 14,785–14,781 years BP.
Fossils found at various locations in Denmark date to the Holocene 9,925–2,865 years BP.
Mesowear analysis of aurochs premolar teeth indicates that it changed from an abrasion-dominated grazer in the Danish Preboreal to a mixed feeder in the Boreal, Atlantic and Subboreal periods of the Holocene.

Description 

According to a 16th century description by Sigismund von Herberstein, the aurochs was pitch-black with a grey streak along the back; his wood carving made in 1556 was based on a culled aurochs, which he had received in Mazovia. In 1827, Charles Hamilton Smith published an image of an aurochs that was based on an oil painting that he had purchased from a merchant in Augsburg, which is thought to have been made in the early 16th century. This painting is thought to have shown an aurochs, although some authors suggested it may have shown a hybrid between an aurochs and domestic cattle, or a Polish steer. Contemporary reconstructions of the aurochs are based on skeletons and the information derived from contemporaneous artistic depictions and historic descriptions of the animal.

Coat colour 
Remains of aurochs hair were not known until the early 1980s. Depictions show that the North African aurochs may have had a light saddle marking on its back. Calves were probably born with a chestnut colour, and young bulls changed to black with a white eel stripe running down the spine, while cows retained a reddish-brown colour. Both sexes had a light-coloured muzzle, but evidence for variation in coat colour does not exist. Egyptian grave paintings show cattle with a reddish-brown coat colour in both sexes, with a light saddle, but the horn shape of these suggest that they may depict domesticated cattle. 
Many primitive cattle breeds, particularly those from Southern Europe, display similar coat colours to the aurochs, including the black colour in bulls with a light eel stripe, a pale mouth, and similar sexual dimorphism in colour. A feature often attributed to the aurochs is blond forehead hairs. According to historical descriptions of the aurochs, it had long and curly forehead hair, but none mentions a certain colour. Although the colour is present in a variety of primitive cattle breeds, it is probably a discolouration that appeared after domestication.

Body shape 

The proportions and body shape of the aurochs were strikingly different from many modern cattle breeds. For example, the legs were considerably longer and more slender, resulting in a shoulder height that nearly equalled the trunk length. The skull, carrying the large horns, was substantially larger and more elongated than in most cattle breeds. As in other wild bovines, the body shape of the aurochs was athletic, and especially in bulls, showed a strongly expressed neck and shoulder musculature. Therefore, the fore hand was larger than the rear, similar to the wisent, but unlike many domesticated cattle. Even in carrying cows, the udder was small and hardly visible from the side; this feature is equal to that of other wild bovines.

Size 
The aurochs was one of the largest herbivores in Holocene Europe. The size of an aurochs appears to have varied by region, with larger specimens in northern Europe than farther south.

The African aurochs was similar in size to the European aurochs in the Pleistocene, but declined in size during the transition to the Holocene; it may have also varied in size geographically.

The body mass of aurochs appears to have shown some variability. The aurochs exhibited considerable sexual dimorphism in the size of males and females.

Horns 
Its horns grew from the skull at a 60° angle to the muzzle facing forwards and were curved in three directions, namely upwards and outwards at the base, then swinging forwards and inwards, then inwards and upwards. The curvature of bull horns was more strongly expressed than horns of cows. Some cattle breeds still show horn shapes similar to that of the aurochs, such as the Spanish fighting bull, and occasionally also individuals of derived breeds.

Genetics
A well-preserved aurochs bone yielded sufficient mitochondrial DNA for a sequence analysis, which showed that its genome consists of 16,338 base pairs. Further studies using the aurochs whole genome sequence have identified candidate microRNA-regulated domestication genes.

Distribution and habitat 
The aurochs was widely distributed in North Africa, Mesopotamia, and throughout Europe to the Pontic–Caspian steppe, Caucasus and Western Siberia in the west and to the Gulf of Finland and Lake Ladoga in the north.

Most fossils in China were found in plains below  in Heilongjiang, Yushu, Jilin, northeastern Manchuria, Inner Mongolia, near Beijing, Yangyuan County in Hebei province, Datong and Dingcun in Shanxi province, Huan County in Gansu  and in Guizhou provinces. Ancient DNA in aurochs fossils found in Northeast China indicate that the aurochs survived in the region until at least 5,000 years BP. Fossils were also excavated on the Korean Peninsula, and in the Japanese archipelago.

Landscapes in Europe probably consisted of dense forests throughout much of the last few thousand years. The aurochs is likely to have used riparian forests and wetlands along lakes. Pollen of mostly small shrubs found in fossiliferous sediments with aurochs remains in China indicate that it preferred temperate grassy plains or grasslands bordering woodlands. It may have also lived in open grasslands. In the warm Atlantic period of the Holocene, it was restricted to remaining open country and forest margins, where competition with livestock and humans gradually increased leading to a successive decline of the aurochs.

Extinction 
In southern Sweden, the aurochs was present during the Holocene climatic optimum until at least 7,800 years BP.
In Denmark, the first known local extinction of the aurochs occurred after the sea level rise on the newly formed Danish islands about 8,000–7,500 years BP, and the last documented aurochs lived in southern Jutland around 3,000 years BP.
The latest known aurochs fossil in Britain dates to 3,245 years BP, and it was probably extinct by 3,000 years ago.

The African aurochs may have survived until at least to the Roman period, as indicated by fossils found in Buto and Faiyum in the Nile Delta. It was still widespread in Europe during the time of the Roman Empire, when it was widely popular as a battle beast in Roman amphitheatres. Excessive hunting began and continued until it was nearly extinct. By the 13th century, the aurochs existed only in small numbers in Eastern Europe, and hunting it became a privilege of nobles and later royals.
Fossils found in West Bengal indicate that the Indian aurochs may have survived until the early 12th century.

The gradual extinction of the aurochs in Central Europe was concurrent with the clearcutting of large forest tracts between the 9th and 12th centuries. The population in Hungary declined since at least the 9th century and was extinct in the 13th century. Subfossil data indicate that it survived in northwestern Transylvania (in Romania) until the 14th to 16th century, in western Moldavia (also in Romania) until probably the early 17th century, and in northeastern Bulgaria and around Sofia until the 17th century at most. An aurochs horn found at a medieval site in Sofia indicates that it survived in western Bulgaria until the second half of the 17th to the first half of the 18th century.

The last known aurochs herd lived in a marshy woodland in Poland's Jaktorów Forest. It decreased from around 50 individuals in the mid 16th century to four individuals by 1601. The last aurochs cow died in 1627 from natural causes.

Behaviour and ecology 
Aurochs formed small herds mainly in winter, but lived singly or in smaller groups during the summer. If aurochs had social behaviour similar to their descendants, social status was gained through displays and fights, in which both cows and bulls engaged. 
With its hypsodont jaw, the aurochs was probably a grazer, with a food selection very similar to domesticated cattle feeding on grass, twigs and acorns.

Mating season was in September, and calves were born in spring. The bulls had severe fights, and evidence from the Jaktorów forest shows these could lead to death. In autumn, aurochs fed up for the winter, and got fatter and shinier than during the rest of the year. Calves stayed with their mother until they were strong enough to join and keep up with the herd on the feeding grounds. They were vulnerable to predation by grey wolf (Canis lupus), brown bear (Ursus arctos), while healthy adult aurochs probably did not have to fear predators. The lion (Panthera leo), tiger (Panthera tigris) and hyena (Crocuta crocuta) were likely predators in prehistoric times. According to historical descriptions, the aurochs was swift and could be very aggressive, but not afraid of humans.

Cultural significance

In Asia 
Acheulean layers in Hunasagi on India's southern Deccan Plateau yielded aurochs bones with cut marks.
An aurochs bone with cut marks induced with flint was found in a Middle Paleolithic layer at the Nesher Ramla Homo site in Israel; it was dated to Marine Isotope Stage 5 about 120,000 years ago.
An archaeological excavation in Israel found traces of a feast held by the Natufian culture around 12,000 years BP, in which three aurochs were eaten. This appears to be an uncommon occurrence in the culture and was held in conjunction with the burial of an older woman, presumably of some social status.
Petroglyphs depicting aurochs in Gobustan Rock Art in Azerbaijan date to the Upper Paleolithic to Neolithic periods.
Aurochs bones and skulls found at the settlements of Mureybet, Hallan Çemi and Çayönü indicate that people stored and shared food in the Pre-Pottery Neolithic B culture.
Remains of an aurochs were also found in a necropolis in Sidon, Lebanon, dating to around 3,700 years BP; the aurochs was buried together with numerous animals, a few human bones and foods.

Seals dating to the Indus Valley civilisation found in Harappa and Mohenjo-daro show an animal with curved horns like an aurochs.
Aurochs figurines were made by the Maykop culture in the Western Caucasus.

The aurochs is denoted in the Akkadian words rīmu and rēmu, both used in the context of hunts by rulers such as Naram-Sin of Akkad, Tiglath-Pileser I and Shalmaneser III; in Mesopotamia, it symbolised power and sexual potency, was an epithet of the gods Enlil and Shamash, denoted prowess as an epithet of the king Sennacherib and the hero Gilgamesh. Wild bulls are frequently referred to in Ugaritic texts as hunted by and sacrificed to the god Baal.
An aurochs is depicted on Babylon's Ishtar Gate, constructed in the 6th century BC.

In Africa 
Petroglyphs depicting aurochs found in the upper Nile valley were dated to the Late Pleistocene about 16–15,000 years BP using luminescence dating and are the oldest engravings found to date in Africa.
Aurochs are part of hunting scenes in reliefs in a tomb at Thebes, Egypt dating to the 20th century BC, and in the mortuary temple of Ramesses III at Medinet Habu dating to around 1175 BC. The latter is the youngest depiction of aurochs in Ancient Egyptian art to date.

In Europe 

The aurochs is widely represented in Paleolithic cave paintings in the Chauvet and Lascaux caves in southern France dating to 36,000 and 21,000 years BP, respectively.
Two Paleolithic rock engravings in the Calabrian Romito Cave depict an aurochs.
Palaeolithic engravings showing aurochs were also found in the Grotta del Genovese on the Italian island of Levanzo.
Upper Paleolithic rock engravings and paintings depicting the aurochs were also found in caves on the Iberian Peninsula dating from the Gravettian to the Magdalenian cultures.
Aurochs bones with chop and cut marks were found at various Mesolithic hunting and butchering sites in France, Luxemburg, Germany, the Netherlands, England and Denmark. Aurochs bones were also found in Mesolithic settlements by the Narva and Emajõgi rivers in Estonia. Aurochs and human bones were uncovered from pits and burnt mounds at several Neolithic sites in England.
A cup found in the Greek site of Vaphio shows a hunting scene, in which people try to capture an aurochs. One of the bulls throws one hunter on the ground while attacking the second with its horns. The cup seems to date to Mycenaean Greece. Greeks and Paeonians hunted aurochs and used their huge horns as trophies, cups for wine, and offerings to the gods and heroes.
The aurochs was described in Julius Caesar's Commentarii de Bello Gallico.
Aurochs were occasionally captured and exhibited in venatio shows in Roman amphitheatres such as the Colosseum. Aurochs horns were often used by Romans as hunting horns.

In the Nibelungenlied, Sigurd kills four aurochs. During the Middle Ages, aurochs horns were used as drinking horns including the horn of the last bull; many aurochs horn sheaths are preserved today. The aurochs drinking horn at Corpus Christi College, Cambridge was engraved with the college's coat of arms in the 17th century.
An aurochs head with a star between its horns and Christian iconographic elements represents the official coat of arms of Moldavia perpetuated for centuries.

Aurochs were hunted with arrows, nets and hunting dogs, and its hair on the forehead was cut from the living animal; belts were made out of this hair and believed to increase the fertility of women. When the aurochs was slaughtered, the os cordis was extracted from the heart; this bone contributed to the mystique and magical powers that were attributed to it.
In eastern Europe, the aurochs has left traces in expressions like "behaving like an aurochs" for a drunken person behaving badly, and "a bloke like an aurochs" for big and strong people.

Domestication 
The earliest known domestication of the aurochs dates to the Neolithic Revolution in the Fertile Crescent, where cattle hunted and kept by Neolithic farmers gradually decreased in size between 9800 and 7500 BC. Aurochs bones found at Mureybet and Göbekli Tepe are larger in size than cattle bones from later Neolithic settlements in northern Syria like Dja'de el-Mughara and Tell Halula.
In Late Neolithic sites of northern Iraq and western Iran dating to the sixth millennium BC, cattle remains are also smaller but more frequent, indicating that domesticated cattle were imported during the Halaf culture from the central Fertile Crescent region.
Results of genetic research indicate that the modern taurine cattle (Bos taurus) arose from 80 aurochs tamed in southeastern Anatolia and northern Syria about 10,500 years ago.
Taurine cattle spread into the Balkans and northern Italy along the Danube River and the coast of the Mediterranean Sea.
Hybridisation between male aurochs and early domestic cattle occurred in central Europe between 9500 and 1000 BC.
Analyses of mitochondrial DNA sequences of Italian aurochs specimens dated to 17–7,000 years ago and 51 modern cattle breeds revealed some degree of introgression of aurochs genes into south European cattle, indicating that female aurochs had contact with free-ranging domestic cattle. Cattle bones of various sizes found at a Chalcolithic settlement in the Kutná Hora District provide further evidence for hybridisation of aurochs and domestic cattle between 3000 and 2800 BC in the Bohemian region.
Whole genome sequencing of a 6,750-year-old aurochs bone found in England was compared with genome sequence data of 81 cattle and single-nucleotide polymorphism data of 1,225 cattle. Results revealed that British and Irish cattle breeds share some genetic variants with the aurochs specimen; early herders in Britain might have been responsible for the local gene flow from aurochs into the ancestors of British and Irish cattle. The Murboden cattle breed also exhibits sporadic introgression of female European aurochs into domestic cattle in the Alps. Domestic cattle continued to diminish in both body and horn size until the Middle Ages.

The Indian aurochs is thought to have been domesticated 10–8,000 years ago.
Aurochs fossils found at the Neolithic site of Mehrgarh in Pakistan are dated to around 8,000 years BP and represent some of the earliest evidence for its domestication on the Indian subcontinent. Female Indian aurochs contributed to the gene pool of zebu (Bos indicus) between 5,500 and 4,000 years BP during the expansion of pastoralism in northern India. The zebu initially spread eastwards to Southeast Asia.
Hybridisation between zebu and early taurine cattle occurred in the Near East after 4,000 years BP coinciding with the drought period during the 4.2-kiloyear event. The zebu was introduced to East Africa about 3,500–2,500 years ago, and reached Mongolia in the 13th and 14th centuries.

A third domestication event thought to have occurred in Egypt's Western Desert is not supported by results of an analysis of genetic admixture, introgression and migration patterns of 3,196 domestic cattle representing 180 populations.

Breeding of aurochs-like cattle 

In the early 1920s, Heinz Heck initiated a selective breeding program in Hellabrunn Zoo attempting to breed back the aurochs using several cattle breeds; the result is called Heck cattle.
Herds of these cattle were released to Oostvaardersplassen, a polder in the Netherlands in the 1980s as aurochs surrogates for naturalistic grazing with the aim to restore prehistorical landscapes. Large numbers of them died of starvation during the cold winters of 2005 and 2010, and the project of no interference ended in 2018.

Starting in 1996, Heck cattle were crossed with southern European cattle breeds such as Sayaguesa Cattle, Chianina and to a lesser extent Spanish Fighting Bulls in the hope of creating a more aurochs-like animal. The resulting crossbreeds are called Taurus cattle. Other breeding-back projects are the Tauros Programme and the Uruz Project.
However, approaches aiming at breeding an aurochs-like phenotype do not equate to an aurochs-like genotype.

See also 

Ur (rune)
Sacred bull
Chillingham cattle

References

External links 

Mammals described in 1827
Bovines
Extinct mammals of Europe
Extinct mammals
Extinct mammals of Asia
Extinct mammals of Africa
Fossil taxa described in 1827
Holocene extinctions
Mammal extinctions since 1500
Pleistocene even-toed ungulates
Pleistocene first appearances
Pliocene even-toed ungulates
Prehistoric bovids
Species made extinct by human activities
Bovids of Africa